Vitsa is one of the largest villages of central Zagori.  It is situated at an altitude of 955m on a mountain slope near the Vikos gorge with roads linking it to Greek National Road 6.  Vitsa is famous for its old double-arched bridge of Missios.

History
During ancient times, Zagori was inhabited by the Molossians. Excavations in the location Genitsari near Vitsa led to the discovery of a settlement possibly of the Tymphaeans or the Molossians dated to the 9th until the 4th century BC. There were signs of the foundations of small buildings from the archaic (geometric) and classical periods and a graveyard with at least 140 graves that contained coins, pottery and weaponry.

The establishment of the village of Vitsa is referred to in other documents from 1321 to 1361, under the name of Vezitsa. Some buildings from Byzantine times are still preserved. The village is divided by a chasm in two districts that were once different villages called Ano Vitsa and Kato Vitsa (Upper and Lower Vitsa). These two villages were always considered, along with Monodendri, as more or less one village, due to their small distance.

After 1430, when the Ottomans conquered Ioannina, Vitsa and the rest of Zagori villages formed an autonomous federation, the Commons of the Zagorisians. Further privileges were granted to the Commons of the Zagorisians  due to the influence of Phanariot Zagorisians over the court of the Sultan, and were preserved until 1868. According to these privileges, Zagori was autonomous and self-governed under the surveillance of the Vekylis of Zagori. Another important privilege that the Zagorians had was the freedom to practice their Christian faith. The absence of direct Ottoman rule helped the inhabitants attain a good standard of living. The main source of income in the 18th and 19th centuries was from remittances from expatriates, as elsewhere in Zagori.

Orthodox Albanians, locally called "Arvanites", have settled the village after the 15th century and were later assimilated into the local population. Sarakatsani have settled at the beginning of the 20th century.

Vitsa became a cultural center for the Zagori region and was the birthplace of people such as the Sarros family (among them politicians and engineers involved at the Suez Canal works in the 19th century) and Nikolaidis (man of literature).

Since the 17th century and until World War II, (when Zagorisian traditional emigration ended), most people from Vitsa would emigrate to Egypt, Asia Minor and the United States. Inside geographical Greece, they mostly emigrated to Macedonia.

Buildings 
In addition to the double arched bridge of Missios (built in 1748 AD), there is the church of Agios Georgios or of the Taxiarches from 1607 AD, the church of Agios Nikolaos (1612 AD, with well preserved frescoes), the church of the Dormition of the Virgin (Κοιμήσεως της Θεοτόκου) from 1554 (repaired in 1720-1728) in Lower Vitsa, the manors of Belogiannis, Vasdekis and Skevis and the Vrizopouleios School. The church of the Stavropegiac Monastery of Prophetes Elias (1632) survives in the north of Vitsa. It was founded upon an older foundation of a small 14th-century church of the Transfiguration of Christ.

Folklore 
Vitsa celebrates the Feast of the Dormition of the Virgin (15 August).

Notable people 
Matthaios Paranikas (1832-1914), scholar, writer and teacher
Dimitrios Sarros (1869/70-1937), scholar, writer, soldier and teacher

Bibliography

References 

Populated places in Ioannina (regional unit)